Tan Hai (born 27 November 1970 in Jinan, Shandong, China) is a professional Chinese association football referee and the associate professor of football department of Beijing Sport University. He has been refereeing in the Chinese Super League since 2005.

Tan became a FIFA referee in 2004. He has served as a referee in competitions including the 2005 and 2008 East Asian Football Championships, AFC Champions League, and 2014 FIFA World Cup qualifiers.

References 

Chinese football referees
Living people
1970 births
Sportspeople from Jinan
Beijing Sport University alumni